The C. C. Van Arsdol House, at 1011 15th Street in Clarkston in Asotin County, Washington, was built in 1882.  It was listed on the National Register of Historic Places in 1975.

The house "is a complex assembly of additions built onto a small one-story, one room homesteader's cottage dating from the early 1880s."  It was a home of civil engineer Cassius C. Van Arsdol.

References

Houses on the National Register of Historic Places in Washington (state)
Houses completed in 1882
Asotin County, Washington